The Campeonato Amazonense, officially Campeonato Amazonense de Futebol Profissional, is the football championship for professional clubs of the state of Amazonas, Brazil.

Format
The 2021 Campeonato Amazonense is divided into two stages:

First Stage
Standard round-robin, in which all teams play each other once. The worst two teams of the stage are relegated to the second division, while the other eight teams advance to the second stage.

Second Stage
The best teams play a two-legged knockout stage, with the best placed team of the match having the second leg at home. The winner of the Finals is declared the champion.

As in any other Brazilian soccer championship, the format can change every year.

Clubs
2021 First Division

Amazonas Futebol Clube
Atlético Clipper Clube
Nacional Fast Clube
Esporte Clube Iranduba da Amazônia
JC Futebol Clube
Manaus Futebol Clube
Nacional Futebol Clube
Penarol Atlético Clube
Princesa do Solimões Esporte Clube
São Raimundo Esporte Clube

List of champions

Titles by team

Teams in bold stills active.

By city

External links
RSSSF

 
Amazonense